Petrus Johannes Lindeque (born 31 January 1991 in Winburg, South Africa) is a former South African rugby union player. His regular position was centre.

Career

Youth rugby

Sharks

He made several appearances for the Under–19 and Under–21 teams of the Sharks over the next few seasons, as well as a further nine first class appearances.

Blue Bulls / Tuks

Sharks

He returned to Durban a few months later, however, when was named as a surprise inclusion in the  touring squad for the 2013 Super Rugby season. He made a total of five appearances during the competition, scoring one try.

Free State Cheetahs

He made just six appearances in the competition and none at all in the 2014 Super Rugby and 2014 Vodacom Cup competition to due a persistent knee injury. In June 2014, the Cheetahs agreed to release Lindeque from the remainder of his contract as he decided to retire, aged 23, to pursue a future in farming.

External links

References

1991 births
Living people
South African rugby union players
Sharks (rugby union) players
Sharks (Currie Cup) players
Blue Bulls players
Free State Cheetahs players
Rugby union centres
Afrikaner people
Rugby union players from the Free State (province)